The Pilgrim is a 2014 Brazilian-Spanish biographical drama film about the Brazilian lyricist and novelist Paulo Coelho. Directed by Daniel Augusto, it stars Júlio Andrade, Ravel Andrade, Fabíula Nascimento, Fabiana Guglielmetti and Lucci Ferreira.

The film focuses on three different moments of the writer's career — his youth in the 60s (period in which is lived by the actor Ravel Andrade); adulthood in the 80s (Julio Andrade); and maturity, in 2013, when he visits once again Santiago de Compostela.

Using as a basis Paulo Coelho's own statements, the history pervades the most striking moments of the life of the author, as the traumas, the relationship with drugs and religion, sexuality and the partnership with musician Raul Seixas.

Cast
Júlio Andrade as Paulo Coelho
Ravel Andrade as Paulo Coelho (young)
Fabiana Gugli as Christina Oiticica
Fabíula Nascimento as Lygia Souza
Enrique Diaz as Pedro Souza
Lucci Ferreira as Raul Seixas
Nancho Novo as Jay Anthony Vaquer

References

External links
 
 

2014 films
2014 biographical drama films
Brazilian biographical drama films
Spanish biographical drama films
Films shot in Rio de Janeiro (city)
Paulo Coelho
2010s Portuguese-language films
2010s Spanish-language films
2014 drama films

Brazilian multilingual films
Spanish multilingual films
2010s Spanish films